Drew Daniel may refer to:

 Drew Daniel, the winning contestant of the fifth American season of television show Big Brother
 Drew Daniel, a member of the American experimental electronic music duo Matmos